Monteagle Mountain is the local name given to a stretch of Interstate 24 near Monteagle, Tennessee that travels over the Cumberland Plateau. Being part of the plateau, it is not technically a mountain, but appears that way to motorists crossing over it. It is frequently referenced as one of the most treacherous stretches of highway in the United States, especially in inclement weather.

Description
The section of I-24 known, tautologically, as Monteagle Mountain consists of a  segment in Grundy and Marion counties that includes both the eastern and western escarpment of the Cumberland Plateau. I-24 also travels concurrently with U.S. Route 64 (US 64) through this section. I-24 crosses the plateau in its narrowest section, which appears as an hourglass shape on maps. Monteagle Mountain is best known for its eastern descent, but its western descent is also one of the most hazardous stretches of Interstate Highway as well. Compared to grades elsewhere, Monteagle's 4–6% grade over a period of several miles does not come close to the steepest. The route contains six lanes over the eastern escarpment, with the extra lane on the westbound side serving as a truck climbing lane, and four lanes over the western escarpment. The Tennessee Department of Transportation (TDOT) has yet to construct a truck lane on the western ascent.

On the eastern descent of the plateau, the eastbound lanes contain a 6% grade over a length of about  where the elevation drops , and is particularly hazardous to truckers. At the top of this downgrade is a truck inspection station, and this downgrade also contains two runaway truck ramps, which are on the left due to the terrain.

The eastern downgrade of Monteagle Mountain also contains the third-widest median of any Interstate Highway, with the others being I-8 through the In-Ko-Pah grade in California and I-84 through the Cabbage Hill grade east of Pendleton, Oregon.. The eastbound lanes descend the mountain on one side of a ridge, while the westbound lanes ascend the other, and are located on what was originally US 64. The westbound ascent is approximately  longer than the eastbound decent, making the westbound side slightly out of line with mileage signing.

While not considered as hazardous as the eastbound descent, the westbound descent contains many curves, including one "c-shaped" curve, protracted over a distance of almost . The eastbound and westbound lanes are also located very close together, and crossover crashes and crashes with Jersey barriers located in the median in some places are common on this stretch. This segment also features off-ramp approach-style lane dividers, in order to slow both motorists and truckers.

A rest area is located at the top of the western escarpment of Monteagle Mountain.

East of the grade, the route passes through a narrow valley alongside Battle Creek, with slight banked curves as it enters Kimball and South Pittsburg. West of the grade, the route enters the relatively flat terrain of the Eastern Highland Rim, passing through Pelham.

Background 
The mountain was part of the Cherokee homeland until 1817. The mountain was named "Eagle Mountain" by the Cherokee because of the great number of golden eagles that roosted and nested along its ridge line. In fact, in honor of those birds, for many years a golden eagle sat in the park in Monteagle until it was stolen as a school prank. It now sits in display at Tennessee Technological University.

After the Cherokee were removed, the area was renamed "Moffit's Station" in May 1870 by John Moffat, a native of Glasgow, Scotland, with his wife and children. It would later become "Moffat Station" and still later, the city of Monteagle.

Route history

US Highways 
US 41 was constructed across the mountain in 1923, which was then known as the Dixie Highway and State Route 2 (SR 2). It later became US 64, and was upgraded to a two-lane road with additional truck climbing lanes on both of the downgrades for a total of three lanes.

Interstate Highway era 
I-24 was constructed across the mountain between 1962 and 1968 by grandfathering in and improving the original segment of US 64. The route on the western downgrade of the mountain was widened to four lanes, and the eastern downgrade with two westbound and one eastbound lane was connected to I-24 while the westbound lanes were constructed. Construction on the westbound lanes was completed in 1973, and the three original lanes of US 41 on the eastern downgrade were converted to the eastbound lanes of I-24. 

Beginning in April 1985, the eastbound lanes of I-24 on the eastern downgrade of Monteagle Mountain were extensively straightened and rebuilt, and the grades reduced. The project also added left shoulders and an additional runaway truck ramp. This work was completed in 1989, and the lanes were reopened on July 11 of that year in a ceremony officiated by then-governor Ned McWherter. The project experienced many setbacks including geological problems, which delayed the project, and the inspection station and additional runaway truck ramp were not planned. Originally targeted for completion in December 1987 at a cost of $17 million, the final cost was $29.5 million. During this time both directions of traffic were routed to the westbound lanes of I-24. After the project was completed, eastbound I-24 was reopened, this time with a new truck climbing lane. A truck station to allow for the adjustment of brakes opened in January 1992.

After the safety improvements were completed, accidents in the eastbound lanes of this stretch dropped from 54 in 1983 to 3 in 1991.

In popular culture
The song "The Legend", written by Jerry Reed as the title song for the film Smokey and the Bandit, describes the Bandit in a harrowing journey down the Monteagle Grade in 1963.
"Monteagle Mountain", a song sang by Johnny Cash written by Thomas Richard McGibony for his 1990 album Boom Chicka Boom. The song is told from the point of view of a truck driver who nearly has an accident descending the eastern grade of the mountain.

References

Transportation in Tennessee
Geography of Grundy County, Tennessee
Geography of Marion County, Tennessee
Transportation in Grundy County, Tennessee
Transportation in Marion County, Tennessee
Interstate 24
Monteagle, Tennessee
U.S. Route 41
U.S. Route 64